Federico Burdisso (born 20 September 2001) is an Italian swimmer. He won a bronze medal in Men's 200 metre butterfly, and Men's 4 × 100 metre medley relay, at the 2020 Summer Olympics.

Career
He won a bronze medal at the 2018 European Championships.

He qualified to represent Italy at the 2020 Summer Olympics.

At the 2022 World Aquatics Championships, Burdisso split a 50.63 for the butterfly leg of the 4×100 metre medley relay in the final to help win the gold medal in a European record and Italian record time of 3:27.51.

Background
He studied and trained at Mount Kelly School from 2017 to 2019. He currently competes collegiately for Northwestern University.

References

External links
Federico Burdisso profile at FIN web site 

2001 births
Living people
Italian male swimmers
Italian male butterfly swimmers
European Championships (multi-sport event) bronze medalists
Swimmers at the 2018 Summer Youth Olympics
European Aquatics Championships medalists in swimming
Medalists at the 2020 Summer Olympics
Olympic bronze medalists in swimming
Olympic bronze medalists for Italy
Swimmers at the 2020 Summer Olympics
Olympic swimmers of Italy
Northwestern Wildcats men's swimmers
World Aquatics Championships medalists in swimming
21st-century Italian people
People educated at Mount Kelly School
Sportspeople from Pavia